The Battle of Tertry was an important engagement in Merovingian Gaul between the forces of Austrasia under Pepin II on one side and those of Neustria and Burgundy on the other. It took place in 687 at Tertry, Somme, and the battle is presented as an heroic account in the Annales mettenses priores. After achieving victory on the battlefield at Tertry, the Austrasians dictated the political future of the Neustrians.

History
The powerful Austrasian mayor of the palace, Pepin II had concluded peace with his Neustrian counterpart, Waratton, in 681.  However, Waratton's successors had renewed the conflict between Austrasia and Neustria, which was common in times of disunion. The Frankish realm was then united under King Theuderic III, who inherited Austrasia in 679. Theuderic III—born and raised in Neustria and a Neustrian at heart—and the nobles of Neustria and Burgundy, under their mayor, Berchar, invaded Austrasia territory.  Berchar and Theuderic were routed at Tertry by Pepin in 687 and the Austrasians held the field. Historian Michael Frassetto avows that the war during which the battle of Tertry occurred was essentially the result of a long-standing feud between Austrasian and Neustrian leaders and the civil strife within Neustria itself. According to the text of the Annales mettenses priores—likely written at the Chelles monastery—Pepin II had led the Austrasians to a magnificent victory during the battle of Tertry.

Their supremacy vindicated on a battlefield, the victors forced Berchar out of office and Pepin appointed Nordebert to act on his behalf in Neustria.  The king was forced to recognise Pepin's mayorship over Austrasia, Neustria and Burgundy. Eclipsing the Neustrian Mayors, Pepin's victory brought about the effective end of the old seat of Merovingian power, enabling the Arnulfing Mayors to control Neustrian political developments.  According to historian Rosamond McKitterick, the Battle of Tertry constitutes one of the decisive moments for the Carolingian house and its history. Despite the importance of Tertry in strengthening Pepin's position, it was another two generations before Pepin the Short claimed the kingship of the Franks.

The legacy of the battle was the further diminution of royal authority; the supremacy of Austrasia over the rest of the realm, characterised by later conquests to the east and the Aachen-centred Carolingian Empire; the undisputed right to rule of the Arnulfing clan, Pepin even taking the title of dux et princeps Francorum; and, finally, the personal gains to Pepin, who "reigned", as one chronicle put it, thereafter over all the Franks for 27 more years. Pepin spent the remainder of the seventh century and the early years of the eighth-century reestablishing Frankish supremacy in Germany, during which time he forced the Frisians, Saxons, Alemanni, Suebians, Thuringians, and Bavari peoples to acknowledge their subordination to the Franks.

From the battle of Tertry forward, a mayor from Pepin's clan remained the senior figure within Francia. Under Pepin's heir — his illegitimate son Charles Martel — the Franks would achieve their most important victory in checking the Muslim advance into central Europe. Martel's rule also delineates the beginning of Carolingian power.

References

Notes

Citations

Bibliography

Literature
 Liber Historiae Francorum 48.
 Continuationes 5.

Tertry
Tertry
Tertry
Tertry
687